John Marshall High School (JMH) is a high school with grade levels including 9th through 12th located on the west side of Cleveland, Ohio. It is part of the Cleveland Metropolitan School District.

History
Built in 1932, John Marshall High School is known for numerous academic programs including college preparatory academies and post-secondary enrollment options. The original high school was located on Lorain Ave. west of W. 150th St. (which still stands and has housed different businesses over the years).  The 1932 building was torn down in 2013, then rebuilt and reopened in 2015 as three small schools underneath one roof known as John Marshall Campus.

Ohio High School Athletic Association State Championships

 Boys Track and Field - 1991,1992 
 Boys Cross Country – 1960,1964 
 Boys Wrestling - 1961

Notable alumni
 Franklin Cover, actor known primarily from the sitcom The Jeffersons
 Tom Stincic, former NFL player with the Dallas Cowboys
 Ed Sustersic, former AAFC player with the Cleveland Browns

Notes and references

External links
 John Marshall High School yearbooks and student newspapers - Various dates from 1940s through 1970s (available at Cleveland Public Library) 
 John Marshall School of Civic and Business Leadership
 John Marshall School of Engineering
 John Marshall School of Information Technology

Marshall
John Marshall
Educational institutions established in 1932
Public high schools in Ohio
1932 establishments in Ohio
Cleveland Metropolitan School District
School buildings completed in 1932